Krishna Kumar Dhruw is an Indian politician and medical practitioner from Chhattisgarh. He is the Indian National Congress MLA of Marwahi state Assembly constituency.

References

Living people
Indian National Congress politicians from Chhattisgarh
Year of birth missing (living people)